Sofian Kheyari (Arabic: خياري سفيان; born 27 January 1984) is an Algerian-French football coach and retired player who is an assistant coach for the Saudi Arabia national team.

Career
Kheyari started his senior career with SO Romorantin. In 2010, he signed for JSM Béjaïa in the Algerian Ligue Professionnelle 1, where he made eight league appearances and scored zero goals. After that, he played for US Créteil-Lusitanos, Riffa SC, A.F.C. Tubize, ASO Chlef, RWDM47, Union Titus Pétange, and AS Cannes.

References

External links
 Interview: Sofian Kheyari, FC Tubize
 JSMB: Kheyari "I am ready to take my place against Blida"
 Sofian Kheyari: "I give myself a few more years" 
 "Tubize in D1 within two years"
 Sofian Kheyari: “A gap between words and deeds”

1984 births
Living people
French footballers
French football managers
Footballers from Val-de-Marne
Association football defenders
SO Romorantin players
FC La Chaux-de-Fonds players
FC Sion players
FC Chiasso players
AS Cannes players
SO Cassis Carnoux players
JSM Béjaïa players
US Créteil-Lusitanos players
Riffa SC players
A.F.C. Tubize players
ASO Chlef players
Championnat National players
Championnat National 3 players
Division d'Honneur players
Swiss Challenge League players
Swiss 1. Liga (football) players
Algerian Ligue Professionnelle 1 players
Algerian Ligue 2 players
Bahraini Premier League players
Challenger Pro League players
Belgian Third Division players
Luxembourg National Division players
French expatriate footballers
Expatriate footballers in Switzerland
French expatriate sportspeople in Switzerland
Expatriate footballers in Algeria
French expatriate sportspeople in Algeria
Expatriate footballers in Bahrain
French expatriate sportspeople in Bahrain
Expatriate footballers in Belgium
French expatriate sportspeople in Belgium
Expatriate footballers in Luxembourg
French expatriate sportspeople in Luxembourg
French expatriate football managers
Expatriate football managers in Saudi Arabia
French expatriate sportspeople in Saudi Arabia
RWDM47 players
French sportspeople of Algerian descent
People from Alfortville